Damir Miranda Mercado (born 26 October 1985) is a Bolivian footballer who plays for Always Ready as a central midfielder.

Honours
Potosí
Bolivian First Division (1): 2007

Bolívar
Bolivian First Division (2): 2011, 2013

References

External links

1985 births
Living people
Sportspeople from Santa Cruz de la Sierra
Bolivian footballers
Bolivia international footballers
Association football midfielders
Club Destroyers players
Club San José players
Club Bolívar players
Sport Boys Warnes players
2015 Copa América players
Club Always Ready players